La Fontenelle (Gallo: La Fontenèll) is a former commune in the Ille-et-Vilaine department of Brittany in north-western France. On 1 January 2019, it was merged into the new commune Val-Couesnon.

Population
Inhabitants of La Fontenelle are called in French Fontenellois.

See also
Communes of the Ille-et-Vilaine department

References

External links

Former communes of Ille-et-Vilaine